State Route 107 (SR 107) is a primary state highway in the U.S. state of Virginia.  The state highway runs  from Interstate 81 (I-81) in Chilhowie north to SR 91 in Saltville in western Smyth County.

Route description

SR 107 begins at the south end of its diamond interchange with I-81 on the southern edge of the town of Chilhowie.  The road continues south as SR 762 (White Top Road).  The state highway heads north as two-lane undivided White Top Avenue.  SR 107 crosses over the Middle Fork Holston River, has a grade crossing of Norfolk Southern Railway's Pulaski District, and intersects U.S. Route 11 (Lee Highway) one block north of Chilhowie's Main Street.  The state highway heads north out of the town of Chilhowie.  SR 107 follows Sulphur Spring Creek through a gap in Brushy Mountain and passes through Lyons Gap through Walker Mountain.  On entering the town of Saltville, the state highway follows Worthy Boulevard, which passes through a sweeping S-curve.  SR 107 reaches its northern terminus at an intersection with SR 91 (Main Street) at the east end of downtown Saltville.

Major intersections

References

External links

Virginia Highways Project: VA 107

107
State Route 107